Siddharthnagar also known as Naugarh is a city and the district headquarters of Siddharthnagar in Uttar Pradesh, India. It is one of the five Vidhan Sabha constituencies in Siddharthnagar district, though the constituency has been renamed to Kapilvastu.  It is a town located near Lumbini, the birthplace of Gautam Buddha.
Lumbini is the best place to visit from Siddharthnagar, It is situated north from Siddharthnagar railway station at the distance of 20 Kilometer.

Demographics
 India census the total population of Siddharthnagar city was 25,422. Males accounted for about 53% (11,570) and females 47% (10,361) of the total population.

Transport
Siddharthnagar railway station is located on the way to Gorakhpur from Gonda via broad gauge of Indian Railway and Buddhist circuit road, the transport facility of Uttar Pradesh. The city also has a bus station and is connected to Gorakhpur via National Highway 730 and also connected with Basti via National Highway 28. From here you can also go to Lucknow, Mumbai and Delhi.

Educational 
 Siddharth University

See also
Uska Bazar
Mahanga
Bansi
Domariyaganj
Shohratgarh
Itwa
Barhani Bazar
Khajuria Sarki
Biskohar
Piprahwa
Birdpur

References

External links

Cities and towns in Siddharthnagar district